Mastana Balochistani (honorifically known as Shah Mastana Balochistani Ji, was an Indian saint and the founder of Dera Sacha Sauda (DSS) in Sirsa (modern Haryana). He was originally from Balochistan, and later moved to Sirsa.

Life

Shah Mastana Balochistani Ji was born as Khemamal to Pila Mal Ji and Tulsa Bai Ji, in Kalat district in Balochistan, British India. Later Baba Sawan Singh honoured him with the name of Shah 'Mastana Balochistani'. Baba Sawan Singh further declared him "Mastanaa-e-Mastanon, Shah-e-Shahon ". At the age of 14 years, Shah Mastana Balochistani Ji left home in search of a perfect spiritual Guru (teacher). At last, after searching for nine years, he reached Beas in the state of Punjab in India, where he met Baba Sawan Singh (the second Guru of Satsang Beas where he attended his Satsang (spiritual congregation). Baba Sawan Singh entrusted Shah Mastana Balochistani Ji with the task of conducting spiritual discourses  and teaching meditation to the people in the provinces of Balochistan, Sindh and Punjab.

Later Baba Sawan Singh assigned Shah Mastana Balochistani Ji duty in the vicinity of Bagarh (region of northern Rajasthan and western Haryana).Shah Mastana Balochistani Ji established Dera Sacha Sauda and raised public awareness of Naam-Shabd. He laid the foundation of Dera Sacha Sauda in 1948 in Sirsa. He absolutely prohibited acceptance of donations or charity of any kind.

Shah Satnam Singh became master of DSS at age 41, serving from 1960 to 1990. Gurmeet Ram Rahim Singh Ji became the third master of DSS on 23 September 1990.

References

Sant Mat gurus